Raj Babbar (born 23 June 1952) is an Indian Hindi and Punjabi film actor and politician belonging to Indian National Congress. He is a three-time member of the Lok Sabha and a two-time member of the Upper House of the Indian Parliament. He was the President of Uttar Pradesh Congress Committee.

Early life
Babbar was born in Agra, Uttar Pradesh, India into a Punjabi family on 23 June 1952. His family has long settled in Tundla, Firozabad since the partition.  He did his initial schooling from Mufid-E-Aam Inter college, Agra. He is an alumnus of the 1975 class of the National School of Drama and graduate from Agra College.

Career
He trained in the Method school of acting at NSD, which is involved in Street Theatre. After his training in New Delhi, he moved to Mumbai and started his film career with Reena Roy, one of the well-known actresses of that time. He gained notoriety for his horrific portrayal of a rapist in the movie Insaaf Ka Taraazu, in which he assaulted the heroine Zeenat Aman, and later her sister, and in the end, is shot and killed by the heroine.

He became a consistent feature of the B. R. Chopra banner; in Nikaah with Deepak Parashar and Salma Agha and in Aaj Ki Aawaz with Smita Patil.

He also achieved success in Punjabi cinema as he gave remarkable performances in Chann Pardesi (1980), Marhi Da Deeva (1989), and Long Da Lishkara (1986) – three art house movies with serious themes treated in a realistic manner, and this was an innovation for the Punjabi films field. He also acted in the hit Punjabi films Aasra Pyar Da (1983), Mahaul Theek Hai (1999), Shaheed Uddham Singh(2000), Yaaran Naal Baharan (2005), Ek Jind Ek Jaan (2006), Apni Boli Apna Des (2009) and Tera Mera Ki Rishta(2009). He appeared in several movies as an antagonist in movies like  Insaf ka Tarazu  (1980), Saazish (1988), Aankhen (1993), Dalaal (1993), The Gambler(1995), Andaz (1994), Yaarana(1995), Barsaat (1995), Ziddi (1997), Gundagardi (1997), Daag the Fire (1999),Indian (2001) and many more, some movies became successful, but some were commercial flops.

He has also acted in television. He appeared in the introductory episodes of the famous Indian TV series Mahabharat, as king Bharat, Bahadur Shah Zafar (1986), as Akbar, alongside the then debutant Juhi Chawla, and also in his home production series; Maharaja Ranjit Singh (2010), all telecast on Doordarshan. In 2014 and 2015, He acted in the serial telecast on Life OK; Pukaar - Call For The Hero, directed by Vipul Amrutlal Shah, with Rannvijay Singh, Adah Sharma and Shubhangi Latkar.

Political life
Raj Babbar entered politics by joining Janata Dal in 1989, which was led by V. P. Singh. He later joined Samajwadi Party and was elected as a Member of the Parliament of India three times. From 1994 to 1999 he was a member of the Rajya Sabha. He was re-elected in the 14th Lok Sabha elections for his second term in 2004. He was suspended from Samajwadi Party in 2006. Later he joined Indian National Congress in 2008 and was elected for his fourth term as Member of Parliament in 2009, by defeating Dimple Yadav, wife of Akhilesh Yadav and daughter-in-law of Mulayam Singh Yadav. In the 2014 Lok Sabha elections, he contested from Ghaziabad and lost to General V. K. Singh. He was appointed as the president of Uttar Pradesh congress committee (UPCC), but in 2019 elections he couldn't even manage to save his own seat and lost to Rajkumar Chahar of the Bharatiya Janata Party by a huge margin of 4,95,065 votes.

Raj Babbar, in the capacity of Congress spokesman, created controversy in 2013, by stating that Rs.12 is sufficient for a common man to get a full meal in Mumbai, which drew severe criticism. He also said that a poor person in India can get full meals two times a day, within Rs. 28 to 32 and opposition parties termed Raj Babbar's statement laughable. Later, he regretted his comments. In July 2013, he compared Narendra Modi to Adolf Hitler, which also created controversy.

Personal life

Raj Babbar married Nadira Zaheer, daughter of noted theatre personality Sajjad Zaheer. Arya Babbar and Juhi Babbar are his children from Nadira. Then he married the actress Smita Patil who gave birth to their son Prateik Babbar. He has two younger brothers, Kishan and Vinod (deceased) and four younger sisters.

Raj Babbar's niece Kajri Babbar is an upcoming filmmaker.

He launched his own home production; Babbar Films Pvt. Ltd. along with his brother Kishan. Under this, he has produced two feature films, Karm Yodha (1992) and Kash Aap Hamare Hote (2003), and the serial Maharaja Ranjit Singh (TV series) (2010).

Awards and nominations
 1981: Nominated: Filmfare Award for Best Actor for Insaaf Ka Tarazu
 1984: Nominated: Filmfare Award for Best Supporting Actor for Agar Tum Na Hote
 1985: Nominated: Filmfare Award for Best Actor for Aaj Ki Awaaz
 1994: Nominated: Filmfare Award for Best Performance in a Negative Role for Dalaal
 1996: Nominated: Filmfare Award for Best Performance in a Negative Role for Yaraana

Selected acting filmography

Films

Television

References

External links

India MPs 2004–2009
1952 births
Indian male film actors
Living people
National School of Drama alumni
Politicians from Agra
Male actors in Bengali cinema
Male actors in Hindi cinema
20th-century Indian male actors
Indian actor-politicians
Indian National Congress politicians
Punjabi people
India MPs 2009–2014
Male actors in Punjabi cinema
Lok Sabha members from Uttar Pradesh
21st-century Indian male actors
United Progressive Alliance candidates in the 2014 Indian general election
Samajwadi Party politicians
Janata Dal politicians
Rajya Sabha members from Uttarakhand
India MPs 1999–2004
People from Agra
People from Firozabad district